Ombersley is a village and civil parish in Wychavon district, in the county of Worcestershire, England. The parish includes the hamlet of  Holt Fleet, where Telford's 1828 Holt Fleet Bridge crosses the River Severn. The 2011 census recorded a population of 2,360 for the parish.

History

The first known reference to the village was the granting of a Charter to Abbot Egwin, later Saint Egwin, of Evesham Abbey in 706 AD. This was the Charter of King Æthelweard of the Hwicce, which granted twelve cassates in Ombersley to the Benedictine Abbey at Evesham.

During the reign of William the Conqueror, the Domesday Book indicates the village was within an exclave of the ancient hundred of Fishborough in 1086 and remained the property of the Abbey of Evesham (Saint Mary). It remained the property of the abbey until the Dissolution of the Monasteries in the early 16th century. By 1848 the village was within the parish of Ombersley (St. Ambrose), in the hundred of Oswaldslow.

Royal forest
Ombersley was part of a Royal forest until 1229. The forest gives the village its name.

Ombersley Court
Ombersley Court is traditional home of the Lords Sandys, many of whom are buried in the family mausoleum in the churchyard of St Andrew's parish church. When St Andrew's was built in its current form between 1825 and 1829, the chancel of the old church was adapted for use as mausoleum for the lords of the manor. The architect of the church was Thomas Rickman; the cost of building was £18,000 of which two-thirds was contributed by Mary Sandys, dowager Marchioness of Downshire. It is grade I listed.

Governance
Since 1973 there  has been a combined parish council for Ombersley and Doverdale. The parish council website, states that "combining of the Parishes of Ombersley and Doverdale in 1973 created one of the largest parishes in Worcestershire", and the Neighbourhood Development Plan refers (eg page 5) to "the parish of Ombersley and Doverdale", but other sources - Office for National Statistics, Ordnance Survey, MapIt,  NHLE - indicate that the two parishes still exist as separate entities.

Ombersley is in Wychavon district of the county of Worcestershire, and in the parliamentary constituency of Mid Worcestershire

Geography
Ombersley is 6 miles north of Worcester, 4 miles west of Droitwich, and 10 miles south of Kidderminster on the intersection of the A449 & A4133. The western boundary of the parish is the River Severn; to the east, Hadley Brook forms much of the boundary with the parish of Doverdale in the east, and the River Salwarpe, to the north of the Droitwich Canal, forms the southern boundary before it joins the Severn.

Listed buildings
 there are 151 listed buildings in the parish. Ombersley Court is grade I listed, five buildings are grade II* listed and 145 are at grade II.

Notes

References and further reading
 'Parishes: Ombersley', A History of the County of Worcester: volume 3 (1913), pp. 460-468.
 Staff. Ombersley Conservation Area Appraisal Wychavon District Council, June 2005

External links 

Photos of Ombersley and surrounding area on geograph
Saint Andrew's Church website

Villages in Worcestershire
English royal forests
Civil parishes in Worcestershire
Wychavon